Michel Haas is a French writer and researcher in the field of paleoanthropology.

Biography 
A former student of the École normale supérieure and agrégé in philosophy in 1973, Michel Haas leeds a career in the academic world. He has taught in France and in the United States, particularly at Yale University (1982) in Connecticut, as a Senior Lecturer.

In addition, he has been working as a reader for the Olivier Orban and published the novel La Dernière Mise à mort which won the prix des Deux Magots in 1983.

He works today for the promotion of science in the field of paleoanthropology and lectures at the Collège des Bernardins.

Works 
 1983: La Dernière Mise à mort — Prix des Deux Magots
 1985: Amoureux fous de Venise (collective work)

References

External links 
 Michel Haas on Data.bnf.fr

École Normale Supérieure alumni
20th-century French non-fiction writers
Prix des Deux Magots winners
Living people
Year of birth missing (living people)